Loxford is part of Ilford in the London Borough of Redbridge in  east London, UK. It is a built-up, multi-ethnic locality.

History
The medieval manor of Loxford was in the possession of Barking Abbey and in 1319 the Abbess of Barking was licensed to fell oaks in Hainault Forest to rebuild her house here after a fire. The present Loxford Hall dates from about 1830 and was enlarged around 1860. The terraced street plan of the Loxford Hall estate was laid out at the end of the nineteenth century as one of a cluster of developments that filled southern Ilford with relatively small and cheap houses. The first Loxford schools were opened in 1904. Loxford School is a new building replacing a secondary school. The Loxford Practice Loxford Polyclinic] - the first purpose-built - opened in 2009.
It is the location of Loxford Water, a tributary of the River Roding that forms the northern boundary of Barking Park. Loxford Hall now serves as a child and family consultation centre for the North East London Foundation Trust. Loxford's main ethnic groups are white, Pakistani and Indian. Ilford Lane has heavy South Asian influences.

Demographics
The Loxford ward of the London Borough of Redbridge has one of the highest numbers of individuals of Pakistani descendant in London at 28.4%, forming the ward's largest ethnic group. The next largest ethnic groups in the 2011 census were Indian (15.6%), Other Asian (10.4%) and White British (10.2%).

The most common religion in Loxford in the 2011 census was Islam, the faith of 46% of the population. This was followed by Christianity (24.5%) and Sikhism (5.6%).

Location
Loxford is located between Ilford to the north and Barking to the south. Ilford Lane (A123 road) is the only main road in the area.

Transport
There are no stations in the area but is served by the rapid bus transit East London Transit EL1 to Ilford and Barking Riverside, using Ilford Lane. The service shares the road and is not segregated, London Buses 169 and 366 also operates within the area. Loxford is connected to the National Road Network by the A123 Ilford Lane.

References

Areas of London
Districts of the London Borough of Redbridge